The Eurovision Song Contest 2011 was the 56th edition of the Eurovision Song Contest. Organised by the European Broadcasting Union (EBU) and host broadcasters Arbeitsgemeinschaft Rundfunkanstalten Deutschland (ARD) and Norddeutscher Rundfunk (NDR), the contest was held at the Düsseldorf Arena and consisted of two semi-finals on 10 and 12 May, and a final on 14 May 2011. The three live shows were presented by German comedians Anke Engelke and Stefan Raab, and television presenter Judith Rakers.

Forty-three countries participated in the contest, equalling the record for the 2008 edition.

The winner was Azerbaijan with the song "Running Scared", performed by Ell and Nikki and written by Stefan Örn, Sandra Bjurman and Iain James Farquharson. This was Azerbaijan's first victory in the contest, after only 4 years of participation. It was also the first male-female duo to win the contest since . Italy, Sweden, Ukraine and Denmark rounded out the top five. Apart from Italy, the only other "Big Five" country to make the top 10 was host nation Germany, finishing tenth. The United Kingdom followed closely behind, finishing eleventh. This was the first time since the juries were reintroduced alongside the televoting in 2009 that the winner did not place first in the jury voting; Italy was the jury winner, while Azerbaijan was the televote winner.

The broadcast of the final won the Rose d'Or award for Best Live Event.

Location 

The contest took place in Düsseldorf, the seventh-largest city in Germany. This was the first contest to take place outside the host nation's capital city since the 2004 contest in Istanbul. It was also the first Eurovision Song Contest held in Germany since German reunification, with West Germany having previously hosted the contest in 1957 and 1983. Germany was also the first member of the "Big Five" to host the contest since the implementation of the rule in 2000 that permits the five largest contributors to the EBU – Germany, France, the United Kingdom, Spain and Italy – to qualify automatically for the grand final alongside the previous year's winner.

The Düsseldorf Arena, a multi-functional football stadium, hosted the contest. The stadium acquired a rental period of six weeks, in order to allow construction and dismantling work in relation to the contest to be carried out. The arena accomodated 35,000 spectators during the contest. Düsseldorf offered 23,000 hotel beds and 2,000 additional beds in the Düsseldorf surroundings and on ships on the River Rhine.

Bidding phase 
Twenty-three cities submit official bids to the German broadcaster Norddeutscher Rundfunk (NDR), in order to be the host city for the 2011 contest. Eight of these cities continued to show interest in hosting the event including Berlin, Hamburg, Hanover, Gelsenkirchen, Düsseldorf, Cologne, Frankfurt and Munich. NDR announced on 21 August 2010 that four of those cities had officially applied to host the 2011 contest: Berlin, Hamburg, Hanover, and Düsseldorf.

Berlin

Concerns were raised about Berlin's bid concept which consisted of an inflatable tent to be built on Tempelhof's hangar area. Decision makers at NDR reportedly doubted the venue's ability to provide advantageous acoustic conditions. Berlin's speaker Richard Meng neither confirmed nor denied that because, he stated, "secrecy about the bid concepts was promised to the NDR".

Düsseldorf

On 24 September 2010, it was announced that Fortuna Düsseldorf football club had applied to the Deutsche Fußball Liga for permission to move its home matches to the Paul-Janes-Stadion if the Düsseldorf Arena was awarded the 2011 Song Contest. This message indicated that talks with Düsseldorf to host the song contest in the Esprit Arena were already at an advanced stage. The club later announced on 6 October 2010 that it had obtained permission to move its games if necessary.

The Neue Ruhr Zeitung newspaper reported on 12 December 2010 that Fortuna Düsseldorf were to be moved to the Paul-Janes-Stadion due to the contest. Fortuna Düsseldorf's training venue next to the Düsseldorf Arena would be equipped with mobile stands from a Swiss event construction specialist, Nussli Group, creating 20,000 extra seats. This decision was made because the Arena Sportpark Düsseldorf holds better logistic qualifications.

Hamburg

On 2 October 2010 the Hamburger Abendblatt newspaper announced that Hamburg would be unable to host the 2011 Song Contest, because the city could no longer fulfil the required financial conditions.

Host selection 
On 12 October 2010, the German broadcaster NDR announced that the Düsseldorf Arena had been chosen as the host venue for the 2011 Eurovision Song Contest.

Key

 Host venue

Format 
The four countries that were part of the "Big Four", along with the host of the contest, automatically qualify for a place in the grand final. Since Germany was both a "Big Four" country and the host for the 2011 contest, there was a vacant spot in the grand final. At a Reference Group meeting in Belgrade it was decided that the existing rules would remain in place, and that the number of participants in the grand final would simply be lowered from twenty-five to twenty-four. On 31 December 2010, the official participation list was published by the EBU, which stipulated that with the return of Italy to the contest, the nation would become a member of the newly expanded "Big Five". This change permitted Italy automatic qualification into the grand final, alongside France, Spain, the United Kingdom and host nation Germany, restoring the number of participants for the grand final to twenty-five nations.

On 30 August 2010, it was announced that Svante Stockselius, Executive Supervisor of the Eurovision Song Contest, would be leaving his position on 31 December 2010. On 26 November 2010, the EBU announced that Jon Ola Sand would succeed Stockselius as Executive Supervisor.

Semi-final allocation draw 
The draw to determine the semi-final running orders was held on 17 January 2011. All of the participating countries excluding the automatic finalists were split into six pots, based on the voting history of those countries in previous years. From these pots, half (or as close to half as was possible) competed in the first semi-final on 10 May 2011. The other half in that particular pot competed in the second semi-final on 12 May 2011. This draw doubled as an approximate running order, in order for the delegations from the countries to know when their rehearsals commenced. The draw also determined in which of the semi-finals the automatic finalists would be able to cast their votes.

Israeli broadcaster IBA requested to compete in the second semi-final, rather than the first semi-final that was pulled in the draw, due to Israel's Memorial Day coinciding with the first semi-final. German broadcaster NDR also requested that it be allowed to vote in the second semi-final for scheduling reasons.

Graphic design 

The design of the contest was built around the motto "Feel your heart beat", with the logo and on-screen graphics designed by Turquoise Branding. The postcard introducing each performance included the logo in the colours of the performing country (e.g. the United Kingdom in red, white and blue); then a German place was shown in a toy-like view using tilt-shift photography and a story happened there, whose main characters were people either living in Germany or tourists from that country. The contest's motto, 'Feel your heart beat', was then shown or said in the country's national or native language. For example, in the first postcard shown (Poland's), the boyfriend drops a piece of paper. The camera then pans down to the paper, to show the Polish phrase "Poczuj bicie serca" handwritten on it. In the second postcard shown (Norway's), a mountain climber from Norway climbs to the top of a mountain and yells the Norwegian phrase "Kjenn ditt hjerte slå.". Then, the heart appeared once again, and the stage and the crowd could be seen, with heartbeat sounds and pink lights pulsating in rhythm with the heartbeat, before the performance started.

The main colours of the letterboxes were black and pink. The scoreboard showed a spokesperson from the country giving their votes on the right, while showing a table of results on the left. The large points (8, 10 and 12) were highlighted in pink, whilst the lower points, (1–7) were in purple. This scoreboard design was used again the following year, with minor changes such as the large points appearing progressively larger in size compared to the lower points and the highlighted colours changed to match the 2012 theme, "Light your fire!"

National host broadcaster 

ARD, the European Broadcasting Union member to broadcast the Eurovision Song Contest in Germany, is a joint organisation of Germany's regional public-service broadcasters. The ARD has 10 members. The venues that were in consideration are located in the areas of three different members: Berlin is located within the Rundfunk Berlin-Brandenburg (RBB) member area, Hamburg and Hanover within the Norddeutscher Rundfunk (NDR) area and Düsseldorf within the Westdeutscher Rundfunk (WDR) broadcasting area. While NDR has been responsible for the transmission of the Eurovision Song Contest in recent years when the final took place in other countries, the financial scope of the three broadcasters seemed to have become a decisive factor in the application procedure for the 2011 Eurovision Song Contest. The Tagesspiegel reported on 7 October 2010 that the costs for hosting this event resulted in a tense discussion about necessary savings on other programme contents made by the three broadcasters.

Hosts 
On 16 December 2010, NDR announced that Anke Engelke, Judith Rakers, and Stefan Raab were to be the presenters for the contest. It was the third time three people would host the contest, the previous such contests being 1999 and 2010. Raab is known as the German representative in 2000 with "Wadde hadde dudde da?", whereas Engelke is an actress and comedian, and Rakers journalist and television presenter.

Event concept and ticket sale 
On 13 October 2010 Thomas Schreiber, coordinator at ARD, outlined details of Düsseldorf's event concept. The Esprit Arena was to be split in two parts separated from each other. On one side of the stadium the stage would be installed while the other side would function as background dressing rooms for the artist delegations. An athletics arena next to the Esprit Arena would serve as the press centre for the event. The Esprit Arena offered comfortable seats relatively near to the stage that created an indoor event arena atmosphere rather than a football-stadium ambiance. There were plans to allow the public the chance to attend the dress rehearsals. Altogether, tickets were sold for seven shows (the grand final, two semi-finals and four dress rehearsals).

He also said in that interview that tickets for the event were likely to go on sale "within the next four weeks" (by mid-November 2010). NDR had already opened a preregistration e-mail-newsletter on its website for all people interested in tickets for the event.

Ticket sales started on 12 December 2010 at 12:12 CET on the website www.dticket.de, the only authorised seller. However, the ticket page opened for sales approximately two hours earlier than originally advertised; this announcement was made by an email newsletter sent to preregistered buyers minutes before opening, giving them a slight benefit in acquiring tickets. The grand final 32,000 tickets that were put on sale on 12 December sold out in less than six hours. Once camera positions had been determined, a few thousand extra tickets were put on sale.

Tickets for the semi-finals were put on sale in mid-January, when it was known which countries would take part in each semi-final.

Participating countries 

On 31 December 2010, it was confirmed that 43 countries would compete in the 2011 contest. The 2011 edition saw the returns of Austria, which had last participated in 2007; Italy, which had last participated in 1997; San Marino, which had only taken part in 2008; and Hungary, which had last participated in 2009. Montenegro had applied to take part in the contest on 4 December, but decided against participation and withdrew on 23 December, two days before 25 December no-strings-attached deadline.

Slovakia announced its withdrawal from the 2011 contest due to financial reasons, despite holding a public poll on the Slovenská televízia (STV) website on its Eurovision participation which received an 87.5% positive vote. STV announced that it planned to return in the 2012 contest. However, Slovakia's application remained on the provisional list, leading to Slovakia's continued participation in the 2011 contest. STV announced in January 2011 that Slovakia would yet withdraw from the contest, citing to financial reasons and organisational changes. However the country was listed by the EBU as one of the semi-finalist countries in the semi-final allocation draw on 17 January, and STV later confirmed they would continue their participation to avoid a fine for a late withdrawal.

At a meeting in Belgrade on 28 August 2010, the EBU decided that each country had to choose its artist and song before 14 March 2011. On 15 March 2011, the draw for the running order took place in the host city. The semi-final allocation draw took place on 17 January in Düsseldorf.

Returning artists 

Several artists made their return to the Eurovision Song Contest, including Dino Merlin, who had represented Bosnia and Herzegovina in 1999. Gunnar Ólason (part of Sjonni's Friends) for Iceland had last appeared in 2001 as part of Two Tricky. Moldova's 2005 entrant Zdob și Zdub also returned. TWiiNS from Slovakia also return, they were backing vocalists for the Czech Republic in 2008. Sophio Toroshelidze, the lead singer of Eldrine from Georgia, was a backing singer for Sofia Nizharadze, Georgia's entry in 2010.

Along with those artists, two previous Eurovision winners also returned to the contest: Dana International who won for Israel in 1998, and Lena who won for Germany in 2010 and brought the contest to Düsseldorf. Stefan Raab, who represented Germany in 2000 and appeared as a conductor and backing artist for other German entries, hosted the contest. This was the first time since 1958 and only the second time in the history of the contest that two former winners returned on the same year.

Semi-final 1 
The first semi-final took place in Esprit Arena in Düsseldorf on 10 May 2011. The ten countries in this semi-final with the highest scoring points, according to a combination of televotes and jury votes from each voting country, qualified for the grand final. Spain and the United Kingdom voted in this semi-final.

Semi-final 2 
The second semi-final took place in Esprit Arena in Düsseldorf on 12 May 2011. The ten countries in this semi-final with the highest scoring points, according to a combination of televotes and jury votes from each voting country, qualified for the grand final. France, Germany and Italy voted in this semi-final.

Final 
The final took place on 14 May 2011. Only the "Big Five" countries automatically qualified for the grand final. From the two semi-finals on 10 and 12 May 2011, twenty countries qualified for the grand final. A total of twenty-five countries competed in the grand final. The voting system used was the same as in the 2010 contest, with a combination of televotes and jury votes selecting the winner. Viewers were able to vote during the performances; the voting window ended 15 minutes after the conclusion of the songs.

Background music for the show included "Wonderful" by Gary Go.

Detailed voting results 

The split jury/televoting results were announced by the EBU after the final. As in 2010, only the split totals received by each country were given, not the full breakdown.

Semi-final 1

12 points 
Below is a summary of the maximum 12 points each country awarded to another in the first semi-final:

Semi-final 2

12 points 
Below is a summary of the maximum 12 points each country awarded to another in the second semi-final:

Final

12 points 
Below is a summary of the maximum 12 points each country awarded to another in the grand final:

A record number of 20 countries received at least one set of 12 points during the grand final. The only countries not to receive full marks were Estonia, Russia, Switzerland, Germany and Serbia.

Spokespersons 

Unlike previous years, the voting order was not drawn with the order of presentation of songs. Rather, the voting order was calculated just before the event, to reduce the likelihood of there being an outright winner from the start. Countries revealed their votes in the following order:

 Dima Bilan
 Maria Ilieva
 Mandy Huydts
 Raffaella Carrà
 Loukas Hamatsos
 Ruslana
 Susan Aho
 Nadia Hasnaoui
 Lusine Tovmasyan
 Kristina Taleska
 Ragnhildur Steinunn Jónsdóttir
 Mária Pietrová
 Alex Jones
 Lise Rønne
 Kati Bellowitsch
 
 Danny Saucedo
 Nicola Della Valle
 Ina Müller
 Safura Alizadeh
 Klemen Slakonja
 
 
 Lena Aroni
 Sofia Nizharadze
 Cyril Féraud
 
 Nevena Rendeli
 Leila Ismailava
 Malvina Cservenschi
 Leon Menkshi
 Kelly Schembri
 Joana Teles
 Éva Novodomszky
 
 Ivana Vidmar
 Derek Mooney
 Elena S. Sánchez
 
 Piret Järvis
 Geta Burlacu
 Maureen Louys
 Aisha

Broadcasts 

Most countries sent commentators to Düsseldorf or commentated from their own country, in order to add insight to the participants and, if necessary, the provision of voting information.

Incidents

Technical issues during semi-final 1
During the first semi-final, many broadcasters lost contact with their commentators due to a technical glitch. Dropouts in the multi-channel sound connections were the cause of this fault, which was corrected, with a second backup system put into place, and tested extensively before the second semi-final.

Other awards 
In addition to the main winner's trophy, the Marcel Bezençon Awards and the Barbara Dex Award were contested during the 2011 Eurovision Song Contest. The OGAE, "General Organisation of Eurovision Fans" voting poll also took place before the contest.

Marcel Bezençon Awards 
The Marcel Bezençon Awards, organised since 2002 by Sweden's then-Head of Delegation and 1992 representative Christer Björkman, and 1984 winner Richard Herrey, honours songs in the contest's final. The awards are divided into three categories: Artistic Award, Composers Award, and Press Award.

OGAE 
OGAE, an organisation of over forty Eurovision Song Contest fan clubs across Europe and beyond, conducts an annual voting poll first held in 2002 as the Marcel Bezençon Fan Award. After all votes were cast, the top-ranked entry in the 2011 poll was Hungary's "What About My Dreams?" performed by Kati Wolf; the top five results are shown below.

Barbara Dex Award 
The Barbara Dex Award is a humorous fan award given to the worst dressed artist each year. Named after Belgium's representative who came last in the 1993 contest, wearing her self-designed dress, the award was handed by the fansite House of Eurovision from 1997 to 2016 and is being carried out by the fansite songfestival.be since 2017.

Official album 

Eurovision Song Contest: Düsseldorf 2011 was the official compilation album of the 2011 contest, put together by the European Broadcasting Union and released by EMI Records and CMC International on 15 April 2011. The album featured all 43 songs that entered in the 2011 contest, including the semi-finalists that failed to qualify into the grand final.

Charts

Notes and references

Notes

References

External links 

 
 Eurovision official website

 
2011
Music festivals in Germany
Eurovision Song Contest
Music in Düsseldorf
2011 song contests
May 2011 events in Europe
Events in Düsseldorf
2010s in Düsseldorf